iRip (formerly named iPodRip, renamed due to iPod trademark) is a commercial iPod recovery tool for Mac OS X, Windows XP and Windows Vista. It features an iTunes style interface, iPod media transfer, and integration with iTunes. It was originally released in August 2003 and has since had over 5 million downloads.

iRip supports all iPods (including iPod Touch) and all iPhones.

It was developed for the Hack Show during MacHack 2003. However, the developer never demonstrated it thinking the hack "too simple"  when compared to Unstoppable Progress and Interface UnBuilder, both of which wowed the audience.

Name change
In November 2009 The Little App Factory was forced by Apple to change the name of iPodRip to remove the trademark iPod. In a bid to gain leniency the developer sent an email to Steve Jobs and this email exchange was leaked garnering headlines due to Steve's succinct reply of "Change your apps name. Not that big of a deal." The software is now known as iRip.

E-Sports Support
In 2010, iRip was a sponsor for some e-sports events.

See also
Comparison of iPod managers

Books that Reference iRip

External links
Official site

References

MacOS multimedia software
IPod software
Shareware
IOS software